Mirboo North Secondary College is a secondary college located in Mirboo North, Victoria, Australia. It has a small number of students numbering approximately 360.

See also
List of high schools in Victoria

References

External links
Official website

Educational institutions established in 1955
Gippsland (region)
Secondary schools in Victoria (Australia)
1955 establishments in Australia